Daniel Mendoza (5 July 1764 – 3 September 1836) (often known as Dan Mendoza) was English prizefighting champion from 1792–1795. He was of Sephardic or Portuguese Jewish descent. 

Mendoza was the most accomplished and scientific fighter of his time; he was intelligent, communicative, a master of ring strategy and defense, and several rungs above his contemporaries. His life was a study in contrasts, however. He could be brave, kind and charismatic, or dangerously violent, and was found guilty of crimes of fraud and assault in 1793 and 1795. His poor money management skills and lack of business acumen landed him in debtors' prison on several occasions. Mendoza played a significant role in the development of scientific technique in boxing, by publishing two books on the subject ('The Art of Boxing' and 'The Modern Art of Boxing') and by holding frequent public exhibitions. He became an heroic and admired figure, and elevated the status of Jews in London during a period of significant antisemitism.

Early life and ancestry
Daniel Mendoza was born in Whitechapel, Aldgate, London, England, on 5 July 1764, to a family of Spanish and Portuguese Jews, also known as Sephardim. By the time he was born, Jews had been allowed to settle in England for about one hundred years, having been readmitted officially by Cromwell in 1656. They were still regarded by many Londoners with a degree of suspicion and confronted antisemitism. His ancestors came from Jaén, Spain; they had emigrated to the Netherlands, which had a policy of toleration, where his grandfather was born. The family moved to London, with ancestors living there for a century before Mendoza's birth. Several sources wrote that some of his London ancestors from Spain had earlier concealed their Jewish identity and converted to Christianity, becoming Marannos. According to many genealogical websites, his parents were Abraham Aaron Mendoza and Esther Lopez and were believed to be artisans. Jewish scholar Albert Hyamson wrote that Aaron Mendoza, a ritual slaughterer or shochet, who had written a book on his craft in 1773, was his grandfather.

Mendoza attended a Jewish school, Shaare Tikvah, where he was instructed in English grammar, writing and arithmetic, as well as Hebrew. He grew up in London's East End in poor surroundings and worked as a glass cutter, laborer, assistant to a green grocer, and an actor before taking up boxing as a profession.

According to several sources, Mendoza was undefeated in 27 straight fights prior to 1788. Bare-knuckle fights ended when an opponent was knocked out or unable to continue, or by foul or draw. Mendoza defeated the following opponents between 1780–82: Tom Wilson, John Horn, John Lloyd, Thomas Monk, John Hand, Bill Move, John Williams, Richard Dennis, George Cannon, Al Fuller, Tom Spencer, William Taylor, John Braintree, William Byrant, John Matthews, George Hoast, George MacKenzie, John Hall, William Cannon, George Barry, George Smith, William Nelson. Despite the general prohibition on boxing at the time, the sport was widely popular; Mendoza's fight against Sam Martin was arranged by the Prince of Wales.

Early career highlights 1780–90
Mendoza's first fight occurred in 1780 when he was 16. At the time, he was working for a tea dealer in Aldgate, London. The fight was not a prize fight for a purse, but a contest to settle a dispute with a porter over payment for a consignment of tea. The porter had demanded twice the agreed price for the consignment and Mendoza said the porter behaved in a manner unfit for a gentleman. After much arguing between the porter and the proprietor of the tea dealership, the porter challenged the owner to settle the dispute by a duel with fists.

Believing the porter was cheating his frail employer, Mendoza accepted the challenge on his behalf. Richard Humphries acted as Mendoza's second. Humphries would later act as a manager for Mendoza, arranging training facilities and securing payment for fights. The duel with the porter took place in the street outside the tea dealership in a hastily constructed ring. The fight lasted for forty-five minutes, ending when the porter declared he was unable to continue. This victory brought a small measure of fame to Mendoza, as stories of the fight spread through the surrounding neighborhoods and portrayed Mendoza as the talented whippersnapper who had not just beaten, but thrashed his larger opponent.

Bout with Harry the Coalheaver, 1784
Turning professional at 18, Mendoza fought at Mile End in 1784 against Harry the Coalheaver. After an incredible 118 rounds, lasting forty minutes, Mendoza brought the larger man into submission.

Bouts with Tom Tyne, 1785 and 1786
Mendoza then fought Tom Tyne, a tailor from Bermondsey. The exact date of this fight is unclear. Mendoza himself claims 1783 but other events in the narrative of his autobiography suggest a date closer to 1786/7. Wheldon (2019) notes that a report in the Public Advertiser seems to set the date accurately at 7th November 1785. The report read as follows: 'Monday, a pitched battle was fought near Wanstead, between Mendoza, the noted fighting Jew, and a tailor, of the Borough, which after a contest of 40 minutes (during which time much real drubbing was given on both sides) was decided in favour of the tailor, to the no small disappointment and regret of the knowing ones'. 

On July 1786  Mendoza fought a rematch against Tyne at Duppas Hill, Croydon, having dispatched a couple of minor fighters in the intervening eight months. The second bout vs Tyne resulted in victory for Mendoza in a fight lasting 27 rounds and almost an hour. Mendoza noted that in the second bout Tyne fought with 'uncommon shyness' and that 'several sporting gentlemen assembled on this occasion'.

Bout with Sam Martin, 1787
After his fight with Sam Martin the Bath Butcher in Barnet on 17 April 1787, which Mendoza won in ten rounds and a total of 26 minutes, he was transported home followed by a cheering crowd who carried lighted torches and sang 'See the Conquering Hero Comes'. After the fight, the Prince of Wales, who would become King George IV, presented Mendoza with 500 pounds, in addition to the 500 pounds he had won in the match, and shook his hand in full view of the gallery. Mendoza used the money to open a boxing school in Capel Court. The recognition by royalty annoyed his second, occasional manager Richard Humphries, who became a rival and planned for a match, but it elevated the stature of Jews in London.
 
With the money he won from the Martin fight, Mendoza is believed to have married first cousin Esther Mendoza around 1789. They would have eleven children, whom Mendoza later struggled to support. Before he married, he promised Esther to quit boxing, but was unable to keep his promise.

Bouts with Richard Humphries, 1787–90

The next phase of Mendoza's career was defined by a series of bouts with his former mentor and second Richard Humphries between 1787 and 1790. The first, and least known, of these took place on 9 September 1787; Mendoza lost in 29 minutes. This fight was not considered as important by historians, perhaps because Humphries dominated, or because there were fewer persons in attendance.

The second bout with Humphries made history. It was the first time spectators were charged an entry-payment to a sporting event. Mendoza and Humphries were personally involved in planning the entry price for attendees, and used newspapers to drum up interest with the intent of obtaining a more profitable deal. The fights were hyped by a series of combative letters published between Humphries and Mendoza. Their meeting finally took place, after postponement, on a rainy 9 January 1788 in Odiham, Hampshire and was attended by 10,000 spectators. Included in the audience were the Prince of Wales and the Duke of York, who wagered 40,000 pounds on the match. Humphries was a 2–1 favourite to win, though Mendoza had his own followers and was heavily backed by the Jewish community, who placed bets and comprised ten per cent of the audience.

The fight was disrupted from a foul called when Humphries' second, the reigning champion, Tom Johnson blocked a blow but, according to Mendoza's account, this did not end the fight. According to his own account, Mendoza slipped on the wet boards of the ring and badly sprained his ankle, preventing him from continuing, and requiring him to forfeit the bout.

At least seven English newspapers of the era, including London's Times and Chronicle, published articles on the Mendoza–Humphries bouts, and United States papers ran stories as well. In one newspaper article to advertise their meeting, Mendoza taunted, "Mr. Humphreys is afraid, he dares not meet me as a boxer … though he has the advantages of strength and age, though a teacher of the art, he meanly shrinks from a public trial of that skill". Humphries replied Mendoza should make the same claim in the ring, and vowed to meet him.

In his third bout against Humphries on 6 May 1789 in Stilton, Huntingdonshire, Mendoza dominated and won on a foul in the 65th round when Humphries was believed to have dropped to the ground without being hit. Mendoza had trained for the bout at the Essex home of his strongest backer, Sir Thomas A. Price. The specially built arena had tiered seating and could accommodate up to 3,000 people, a more modest crowd than at his second bout. The battle commenced a little after one o'clock in the afternoon. The smaller crowd may have been due to Huntingdonshire being a long journey for many fans, ninety miles from London. It was clear early in the fight that Mendoza's hand and foot work were vastly superior to Humphries', though both men were accomplished scientific boxers and had studied each other's style. The Times of London declared Mendoza the champion of England.

Mendoza won his fourth and final bout with Humphries on 29 September 1790 in an incredible 72 rounds in Doncaster Recognised by many for his previous win, Mendoza was the 5–4 favourite, and he thoroughly thrashed his opponent, ten minutes into the bout. Pierce Egan, English boxing author of the period, noted that many in the crowd were behind Mendoza although many London fans were anti-semitic, and that the "humanity of Mendoza was conspicuous throughout the fight—often was it witnessed that Dan threw his arm when he might have put in a most tremendous blow upon his exhausted adversary".

Becoming the All England Champion

The retirements of previous champions Tom Johnson and Ben Brain in 1791 left the English prizefighting championship vacant. On 14 May 1792, Mendoza fought a much anticipated bout at Smitham Bottom, Croydon, against Bill Warr (or Ward) his former sparring-partner. This fight resulted in a victory for Mendoza in 23 rounds, 116 minutes, after which he was recognised as all England champion. In a era pre-dating the existence of separate weight-based championships, this was a very significant achievement for a fighter who in modern times would be characterised as a middleweight.

After his win against Warr, Mendoza is believed to have met with King George III at Windsor Castle. He was the first English Jew to speak to a king. Poems and songs were written of Mendoza, he sat for portraits, and was asked to give boxing exhibitions at London's prestigious Covent Gardens. Mendoza was paid 50 English pounds, an impressive sum in 1790, for several of his boxing demonstrations at Covent Gardens, which he conducted as often as three times a week.

In 1791 Mendoza went on a sparring and exhibition tour of the British Isles with a travelling circus. Once in Ireland, he soundly defeated the burly amateur known as "Squire Fitzgerald," who on 2 August had expressed a desire to test his skill with the champion.

Mendoza's style of boxing

Pierce Egan recorded that ‘Mendoza was considered one of the most elegant and scientific pugilists in the whole race of boxers. […] He rose up like a phenomenon in the pugilistic hemisphere, and was a star of the first brilliancy for a considerable period’. The anonymous work Pancratia (1812) noted that ‘In his manner there is more neatness than strength, and it has been said, more show than service; his blows are in general deficient in force, but given with astonishing quickness, and he is [agreed] to strike oftener, and stop more dexterously, than any other man.’  

Other attributes considered typical of Mendoza’s style were: ‘stopping and returning with the same hand’, and extensive use of the ‘chopper’ (a backhanded punch, often delivered with the same hand that had just been used to make a block). He was also noted for his ability in ‘tiring out a man’s strength […] by acting on the defensive till the assault in turn could be practiced with success’. Mendoza was believed to have ‘derived his primitive knowledge of boxing from the tuition of his elegant rival Humphreys; but he so rapidly improved upon the system of his master, as to remain several years without a rival’.

Mendoza as a teacher
Mendoza’s contribution to the development of scientific technique came as much from his ability as a teacher as from his own personal boxing style. In 1789 he published two books, The Art of Boxing, and The Modern Art of Boxing, and from 1790 onwards he frequently offered public exhibitions of pugilism in theatres, either in London or across the provinces. Mendoza also worked closely with a number of later pugilists, either as a trainer or as a second (i.e. cornerman in modern parlance). Egan noted that ‘as a teacher […], it might almost be said, that [Mendoza] was without a competitor, and turned out some excellent pupils.’

The influence of Mendoza’s books is perhaps unclear. The Art of Boxing devotes just 28 pages to boxing technique, but a further 67 to documenting the ill-tempered correspondence that had passed between Mendoza and Humphreys. The Modern Art of Boxing (a slim 48 page tome) is described by Mendoza as ‘a selection from different works on the same subject’ (it contains material taken directly from, for example, Godfrey’s 1747 treatise on self-defence). Contained in both of these works are Mendoza’s ‘Six Lessons’  (described as being 'for the use of his scholars'). These consist of exercises whereby the master makes various attacks and the student is told how to defend against them. The 'Six Lessons' can be seen as an expression of Mendoza’s style as described above, with much concentration on defensive technique and counter-attack.      

With the popular support he gained from his boxing victories, Mendoza helped transform the popular English stereotype of a Jew from an anonymous weak, and defenseless person into an individual deserving of respect. This image was bolstered by his conference with the future King George IV, when they met in public view after the Martin fight.

Later career 1793–95
Though he remained an admired and heroic figure, Mendoza's decline in popular support may have partly been due to public knowledge of several crimes he committed, which he omitted from his memoirs. He may have been deported early in his life for robbery, was undoubtedly accused of fraud in a well publicised Old Bailey trial in October 1793, and was found guilty in a London trial of viciously assaulting a woman, Rachel Joel, for insulting his wife in 1795. Violent acts were not unknown to his children, either. Two of his sons, Daniel and Abraham, in separate incidents were deported for acts of violence against two gentlemen they had just robbed.

After a stay in a debtors' prison, he resumed training and defeated Bill Warr again on 12 November 1794, completely outclassing him in only seventeen minutes at Bexley Common. Declining in popularity despite holding the championship, his purse was too small to provide food for his starving family, so he found work as a recruiting Sargent.

Loss of English championship, 1795

 
On 15 April 1795, Mendoza fought "Gentleman" John Jackson for the English championship on a stage at Hornchurch in Essex. At a muscular twenty-six, Jackson was five years younger than Mendoza's weary thirty-one,  taller, and  heavier. Two hundred guineas, or a little over two hundred British pounds, were laid on each side, and the future King William IV was among the audience. The bout was only Jackson's third professional fight, but Mendoza's age, months in prison and years of punishment gave the advantage to the less-battered Jackson. The bigger man won in nine rounds, paving the way to victory by muscling Mendoza into the corner of the ring, grabbing his hair and pummeling his head with uppercuts using his free hand. Mendoza managed to come back up to scratch after this, but was soon knocked out. Jackson beat him into submission by the end of the ninth round. Mendoza asked for a foul for the hair pulling, but it was ruled to be legal at the time. Many pugilists, such as James Figg and Jack Broughton, shaved their heads to avoid the possibility of this, until hair-pulling was eventually banned in boxing. Mendoza retired after his loss, and though he attempted boxing comebacks, he never again enjoyed the same-size audiences or received large purses. Although Mendoza continued sparring tours well into the nineteenth century, 1795 marked the beginning of a steep decline in his popularity and for the most part, his income. He very rarely appeared in the London newspapers after this period, and had lost respect with much of the public.

In 1799, Mendoza contracted a debt and ended in Carlisle Prison. Though he was bailed out by friends in the Freemasons, he later served another six months. With great connections, though a convict, he was later appointed Sheriff's Assistant to the County of Middlesex in 1806, though he would have to evade prison again in later life due to mounting debts.

Work at Admiral Nelson pub, 1806–09

Victory over Harry Lee
On 21 March 1806, at Grinstead Green, Mendoza returned to the ring and defeated the taller Harry Lee in 53 grueling rounds. Mendoza had cemented his reputation, and was a 3–1 favourite in the betting. The purse was 50 guineas, or a little over fifty pounds, for each boxer. Mendoza began to seek other sources of income, becoming the landlord of the "Admiral Nelson" pub and public house in Whitechapel with his money from the Lee fight. He continued his work at the pub for a number of years. He turned down a number of offers for re-matches and in 1807 wrote a letter to The Times of London in which he said he was devoting himself chiefly to teaching the art of boxing.

In 1809 he and some associates were hired by the theatre manager John Philip Kemble of Covent Gardens in an attempt to suppress the Old Price Riots. The riots lasted three months and became a violent uprising of British commoners against the increase in prices at the new theatre after the old theatre had burnt down. The resulting poor publicity probably cost Mendoza much of his remaining popular support, as he was seen to be fighting on the side of the privileged. The anger against the raising of the prices also sparked additional antisemitism in London and apparently, judging by the press accounts, against Mendoza himself.

He published his second book, the autobiographical "Memoirs of the Life of Daniel Mendoza" in 1816.

Though not well documented, Mendoza went on several exhibition tours through the British Isles, the most successful being those made in the summer of 1819.

Mendoza made and spent a fortune. His memoirs report that he tried a number of ventures, including touring the British Isles giving boxing demonstrations, working as an actor, working in the oil and wine business, opening a boxing academy at the Lyceum in the Strand or government district of London, working as a recruiting sergeant for the army, and printing his own paper money.

Final loss and death, 1836
He made his last public appearance as a boxer on 4 July 1820, one day short of his 56th birthday, at Banstead Downs in a grudge match against former boxer Thomas Owen, at that point a London innkeeper and five years Mendoza's younger. Mendoza had not fought for 14 years. In need of money, he made a questionable choice, and was defeated after 12 rounds.

According to several sources, he continued his work as an inn keeper and landlord, likely at the Admiral Nelson, in the later years of his life, and just before his death.

Though intelligent, and charismatic, his life was chaotic, and the mismanagement of his earnings proved a fatal flaw. He died on 3 September 1836 at the age of 72, reportedly at his home in Horseshoe Alley on London's Petticoat Lane, tragically leaving his wife Ester and family of eleven in poverty. He was initially buried in the Nuevo Sephardic Cemetery, a Jewish Cemetery near Mile End, now part of the campus of Queen Mary University of London and later reburied in Brentwood Jewish Cemetery in Essex, England.

Pierce Egan, the author of Boxiana, a boxing history of the period, said of Mendoza that he was "a complete artist" and "a star of the first brilliancy." On the subject of race prejudice, Egan wrote, "In spite of his prejudice, he (the Christian) was compelled to exclaim—Mendoza was a pugilist of no ordinary merit." Egan further wrote "No pugilist whatever, since the time of Broughton (or even Broughton himself), has ever so completely elucidated, or promulgated, the principles of boxing as Daniel Mendoza". (Broughton was the first Englishman to write rules for the sport of boxing.)

Boxing achievements and honours

|-

|-

Halls of Fame
In 1954 Mendoza was elected to The Ring magazine Hall of Fame (Boxing Hall of Fame)
Mendoza was inducted into the International Jewish Sports Hall of Fame in 1981
In 1990 he was inducted into the inaugural class of the International Boxing Hall of Fame
In 2017, Mendoza was inducted in the Bare Knuckle Boxing Hall of Fame

References in popular culture
 The English actor Peter Sellers was Mendoza's 1st cousin four times removed and hung portraits of the boxer in the backgrounds of several of his films. The Australian writer David Malouf is descended in the same degree from Mendoza.
 Mendoza appears in several Gillray cartoons.
 Mendoza appears as a character in the 1942 British drama The Young Mr. Pitt.
 In September 2008, a commemorative plaque to Dan Mendoza (made by Louise Soloway) was unveiled in London by Sir Henry Cooper. It hangs on the wall of the main library of Queen Mary University of London, adjacent to the student cafeteria.
 His former home on Paradise Row in Bethnal Green is marked by a blue plaque.
 A play about Mendoza, The Punishing Blow, by Randy Cohen, debuted in 2009.
 Daniel Mendoza has been the subject of two historical comic books:
 "Mendoza The Great" is one of the anthology stories featured in The Victor comics drawn by artist Ted Rawlings.
 Mendoza the Jew: Boxing, Manliness, and Nationalism, A Graphic History is a book written by Ronald Schechter and illustrated by Liz Clarke.
 Mendoza appears as a character in the 1934 movie The Scarlet Pimpernel at approximately the 40-minute mark.

See also
List of select Jewish boxers

References
Notes

Citations

Further reading
 A Treasury of Jewish Folklore: Nathan Ausubel
  Memoirs of the life of Daniel Mendoza OCLC 2963035
 
 The Art of Boxing; by Daniel Mendoza; Originals will be hard to find, but reprints are available.
 The Memoirs of the Life of Daniel Mendoza (1816); A biography by Mendoza himself, very hard to find, although it has been reprinted
 The Memoirs of the Life of Daniel Mendoza; A reprint, edited by Paul Magriel (first edition 1951)
 The Memoirs of the Life of Daniel Mendoza; A reprint, edited by Alex Joanides (2011)
 
 Harold U. Ribalow, Daniel Mendoza, Fighter from Whitechapel (New York: Farrer, Straus, and Cudahy, Inc., 1962)
 Wynn Wheldon The Fighting Jew: the Life & Times of Daniel Mendoza, 2019.

External links
Chapter on Mendoza in Pierce Egan's Boxiana, or Sketches of Pugilism Ancient and Modern (1830 reprint of the 1813 original)
Pancratia, or a History of Pugilism, containing a full account of every battle of note... (1812). Mendoza's major fights (two vs Warr and one vs Jackson) are described on pages 104, 117 & 118.
Description of Mendoza in The Sporting Magazine, April 1793.
Contemporary report of Mendoza vs Warr, 1794, in The Sporting Magazine, Nov 1794.
Contemporary report of Mendoza vs Jackson 1795, in The Sporting Magazine, April 1795.   

Broken and Outcast short film.
Daniel Mendoza at the International Jewish Sports Hall of Fame.
Extracts from Daniel Mendoza's Boxing Manual hosted at the Linacre School of Defense website.
Daniel Mendoza on the International Boxing Hall of Fame website

1764 births
1836 deaths
Bare-knuckle boxers
English male boxers
English Jews
International Boxing Hall of Fame inductees
World heavyweight boxing champions
Jewish boxers
English people of Portuguese-Jewish descent
People from Whitechapel
Jewish British sportspeople
Boxers from Greater London
People imprisoned for debt
18th-century English people